This is a list of universities in Aruba.

Universities 

 American University School of Medicine Aruba 
 Aureus University School of Medicine 
 Bay University School of Medicine
 University of Aruba 
 Xavier University School of Medicine
 Pedagogical Aruban Institute (I.P.A)
 Academy for Justice and Security Aruba

See also 
 List of universities by country

 
Aruba
Aruba

Universities